|}

The Prix Gladiateur is a Group 3 flat horse race in France open to thoroughbreds aged four years or older. It is run at Longchamp over a distance of 3,100 metres (about 1 mile and 7½ furlongs), and it is scheduled to take place each year in September.

History
The event is considered to be France's oldest surviving horse race. It was established in 1807, and was originally called the Grand Prix. The first version was contested over two circuits of the Champ de Mars, a distance of 4,000 metres.

The race was renamed the Grand Prix Royal in 1834. It was held at Chantilly in 1846. It became known as the Grand Prix National in 1848, and the Grand Prix Impérial in 1853.

The Grand Prix Impérial was transferred to Longchamp and increased to 6,000 metres in 1857. It was retitled the Grand Prix de l'Empereur and extended to 6,200 metres in 1861. This distance, about 3 miles and 7 furlongs, was maintained for almost a century.

The race was renamed in honour of Gladiateur, a notable previous winner, in 1869. The newly titled Prix Gladiateur was cancelled because of the Franco-Prussian War in 1870.

The race took place at Chantilly in 1906. It was abandoned throughout World War I, with no running from 1914 to 1918. It was cancelled twice during World War II, in 1939 and 1940. It was staged at Le Tremblay in 1943 and 1944.

The Prix Gladiateur was cut to 4,800 metres in 1955. It was shortened to 4,000 metres in 1977, and to 3,100 metres in 1991.

Records

Most successful horse (3 wins):

 Called To The Bar – 2018, 2019, 2020

Leading jockey (5 wins):
 Spreoty – Hervine (1852), Echelle (1853), Royal Quand Meme (1854), Monarque (1857), Mon Etoile (1862)
 Christophe Soumillon – Reefscape (2005), Domeside (2013), Walzertakt (2015), Vazirabad (2016, 2017)
 Maxime Guyon - Bathyrhon (2014), Called To The Bar (2018, 2019, 2020), Big Call (2022)

Leading trainer (13 wins):
 Tom Jennings – Hervine (1852), Echelle (1853), Royal Quand Meme (1854), Monarque (1857), Lysiscote (1860), Surprise (1861), Gladiateur (1866), Auguste (1868), Trocadero (1869), Nougat (1876), Verneuil (1878), Clementine (1879), Courtois (1880)

Leading owner (10 wins):
 Frédéric de Lagrange – Monarque (1857), Lysiscote (1860), Surprise (1861), Gladiateur (1866), Auguste (1868), Trocadero (1869), Nougat (1876), Verneuil (1878), Clementine (1879), Courtois (1880)

Winners since 1981

 Fly With Me finished first in 2015 but was disqualified after testing positive for a banned substance.

 The 2016 & 2017 runnings took place at Chantilly while Longchamp was closed for redevelopment.

Earlier winners

 1834: Felix
 1835: Miss Annette
 1836: Volante
 1837: Franck
 1838: Corisandre
 1839: Eylau
 1840: Nautilus
 1841: Giges
 1842: Minuit
 1843: Jenny
 1844: Drummer
 1845: Cavatine
 1846: Fitz Emilius
 1847: Predestinee
 1848: Morok
 1849: Dulcamara
 1850: Serenade
 1851: Messine
 1852: Hervine
 1853: Echelle
 1854: Royal Quand Meme
 1855: Festival
 1856: Ronzi
 1857: Monarque
 1858: Miss Cath
 1859: Tippler
 1860: Lysiscote
 1861: Surprise
 1862: Mon Etoile
 1863: Souvenir
 1864: Noelie
 1865: Ninon de Lenclos
 1866: Gladiateur
 1867: Vertugadin
 1868: Auguste
 1869: Trocadero
 1870: no race
 1871: Don Carlos
 1872: Dutch Skater
 1873: Barbillon
 1874: Christiania
 1875: Figaro
 1876: Nougat
 1877: Mondaine
 1878: Verneuil
 1879: Clementine
 1880: Courtois
 1881: Pourquoi
 1882: Bariolet
 1883: Mademoiselle de Senlis
 1884: Satory
 1885: Lavaret
 1886: Escarboucle
 1887: Upas
 1888: Tenebreuse
 1889: Tenebreuse
 1890: Carmaux
 1891: Mirabeau
 1892: Primrose
 1893: Aquarium
 1894: Aquarium
 1895: La Licorne
 1896: Omnium II
 1897: Elf
 1898: Elf
 1899: Patriarche
 1900: Sospiro
 1901: Mademoiselle de Longchamps
 1902: Amer Picon
 1903: Amer Picon
 1904: Vieux Paris
 1905: Maximum
 1906: Clyde
 1907: Punta Gorda
 1908: Rabat Joie
 1909: Sea Sick
 1910: Pierre Benite
 1911: Basse Pointe
 1912: Chambre de l'Edit
 1913: Philippe
 1914–18: no race
 1919: Passebreul
 1920: Bachlyk
 1921: Odol
 1922: Flechois
 1923: Flechois
 1924: Trevise
 1925: Cerfeuil
 1926: Tomy
 1927: Soun
 1928: Bouda
 1929: Nopal
 1930: Monsieur le Marechal
 1931: Filidor
 1932: Reverende
 1933: Voila
 1934: Prince Oli
 1935: Dejazcomba
 1936: Bokbul
 1937: Trevisani
 1938: Pretender
 1939–40: no race
 1941: Rosette
 1942: Ughald
 1943: L'Aligote
 1944: Marsyas
 1945: Woodcutter
 1946: Albor
 1947: Blue Butterfly
 1948: Monticola
 1949: Blue Butterfly
 1950: Vatelys
 1951: Deux Points
 1952: Ysard
 1953: Xaret
 1954: Ring Etoile
 1955: Fil Rouge
 1956: Savoyard
 1957: Romantisme
 1958: Ranchiquito
 1959: Epsom Victory
 1960: Epsom Victory
 1961: Taine
 1962: Hunch
 1963: Kistinie
 1964: Greyhound
 1965: Fantomas
 1966: Pompon Rouge
 1967: Alciglide
 1968: Samos
 1969: Clairon
 1970: Faux Monnayeur
 1971: Barado
 1972: Hickleton
 1973: Lassalle
 1974: Forceful
 1975: Campo Moro
 1976: Knight Templar
 1977: John Cherry
 1978: Biliboy
 1979: Marson
 1980: Anifa

See also
 List of French flat horse races
 Recurring sporting events established in 1807 – this race is included under its original title, Grand Prix.

References
 France Galop / Racing Post:

 france-galop.com – A Brief History: Prix Gladiateur.
 galopp-sieger.de – Prix Gladiateur (ex Grand Prix de l'Empereur).
 horseracingintfed.com – International Federation of Horseracing Authorities – Prix Gladiateur (2016).
 pedigreequery.com – Prix Gladiateur – Longchamp.

Open long distance horse races
Longchamp Racecourse
Horse races in France
1807 establishments in France